North Wales is a historic plantation and national historic district located in Fauquier County, Virginia near Warrenton, Virginia.  Currently it is a  historic district that includes a manor home and farm.  A date of significance for the site is 1776.  It was listed on the National Register of Historic Places in 1999.

The listed area includes work by Little & Browne and other architects and/or builders.  It includes Georgian and Colonial Revival architecture in 38 contributing buildings, eight contributing sites and contributing structures.

The estate on 1,471 acres was sold to former Goldman Sachs partner David B. Ford September 30, 2014 for $21 Million. Ford has acquired other historic properties including the noted record-breaking purchase of Newport, RI Gilded Age mansion Miramar by architect Horace Trumbauer, for $17.15 million in 2006.

References

External links
North Wales sales brochure

Houses on the National Register of Historic Places in Virginia
National Register of Historic Places in Fauquier County, Virginia
Georgian architecture in Virginia
Colonial Revival architecture in Virginia
Houses completed in 1776
Houses in Fauquier County, Virginia
Historic districts on the National Register of Historic Places in Virginia